Melanesian cuckooshrike is a common name for several birds in the genus Coracina and may refer to:

 North Melanesian cuckooshrike (Coracina welchmani)
 South Melanesian cuckooshrike (Coracina caledonica)

Coracina